Lavajatus is a monotypic genus of gastropods belonging to the family Achatinidae. The only species is Lavajatus moroi. 

The species is found in Brazil.

References

External links
 Simone, L. R. L. (2018). Lavajatus moroi, new cavernicolous Subulininae from Ceará, Brazil (Gastropoda, Eupulmonata, Achatinidae). Spixiana. 41(2): 173-187

Achatinidae
Monotypic gastropod genera